Wattala Divisional Secretariat is a  Divisional Secretariat  of Gampaha District, of Western Province, Sri Lanka.

It is a thriving city with major infrastructure facilities available. 
Important landmarks in Wattala include St. Sebastian's Church, Enderamulla, St. Anne's Church, Wattala and Sri Sivasubranya Swamy Temple, Hekitta.

Wattala also hosts popular schools such as St. Anne's Balika Maha Vidyalaya, Wattala, St. Joseph's College, Wattala, St. Sebastian's Maha Vidyalaya, Enderamulla, Lyceum International School,  OKI International School and St. Anthony's College, Wattala.

References
 Divisional Secretariats Portal

Divisional Secretariats of Gampaha District